Richard Kerr may refer to:

 Richard Kerr (songwriter), English composer
 Richard James Kerr (born 1935), deputy director of the C.I.A., 1989–1992
 Dickey Kerr (Richard Henry Kerr, 1893–1963), American baseball pitcher
 Richard Kerr (artist) (born 1952), Canadian filmmaker
Richard A. Kerr, science journalist